Dagebüll Lighthouse is a retired lighthouse in Dagebüll, Nordfriesland, Germany. Until its replacement in 1988 by a direction light on the dock of the Dagebüll ferry port, it served as the lower light of the Dagebüll range of leading lights. The lighthouse is situated in the southern part of the municipality near the depot of the lorry rail to islands of Oland and Langeneß. The lighthouse has a pitched roof, a black and green copper construction.

As of 2018, the tower is being used as a hotel room for 2 guests.

See also 

 List of lighthouses and lightvessels in Germany

References

External links 
 

Lighthouses in Schleswig-Holstein
Buildings and structures in Nordfriesland
Lighthouses completed in 1929